John "Cornbread" Anderson is an American folk artist from rural Lumpkin, Georgia. He is known for his paintings of animals, particularly the guinea fowl, with large eyes.

Biography 
Anderson grew up in the woods of the Mill Creek community in Lumpkin. He has held a variety of jobs, including being a butcher, a mechanic, a police officer, and manager of a farm. Both his mother and wife are visual artists. In 1995, he began to explore art by painting the animals (both from the farm and wild) and scenes he was so familiar with. He is a religious (Christian) and down to earth man, concerned with the loss of habitat for southern wildlife as Atlanta, GA expands.

Anderson currently lives in North Georgia with his wife, Jana, and two sons, Poley and Isaac. His art has become his full-time job, and he is now a well known artist in the world of Southern Folk Art.

Style 
Anderson's subject matter is based around wildlife as well as life on a farm. "Fox, quail and guinea hens are among his favorite subjects but raccoon, deer and fish sneak in from time to time." He uses a variety of materials to paint on, including metal, wood, cardboard, and canvas. His work is distinguishable from other artists because his animals have large, round eyes. He "uses a vibrant palette and paints in an energetic, strong style..."

While urban sprawl wreaks havoc on natural places, Cornbread renders these animals in bright colors and energetic strokes.

References 

 "Around Back At Rocky's Place. Cornbread." Around Back At Rocky's Place. Cornbread. N.p., n.d. Web. 30 Sept. 2015.
 "Cornbread | Main Street Gallery." Cornbread | Main Street Gallery. N.p., n.d. Web. 30 Sept. 2015.
 "Southern Visionary Art: Folk Art Online Gallery." Southern Visionary Art: Folk Art Online Gallery. N.p., n.d. Web. 30 Sept. 2015.

American painters
American male painters
People from Lumpkin, Georgia
Year of birth missing (living people)
Living people
Southern art
Artists from Georgia (U.S. state)
Painters from Georgia (U.S. state)
American bird artists
Animal painters
Art in Georgia (U.S. state)